No. 4 Group was a Royal Air Force group, originally formed in the First World War, and reformed in the wake of the Second World War, mostly part of RAF Bomber Command, but ending its days in RAF Transport Command.

History

Formation in the First World War

No. 4 Group was originally formed in October 1918 at the Seaplane Experimental Station, Felixstowe just before the end of the First World War and disbanded a year later in 1919. In its first incarnation, No. 4 Group was created by augmenting the former Royal Naval Air Service group at RNAS Great Yarmouth which had been responsible for anti-submarine and anti-Zeppelin operations over the North Sea. The former RNAS group was designated as No. 73 Wing within the new No. 4 Group. The commanding officer of No. 4 Group was Colonel C R Samson. With the 1918–1919 postwar demobilization of the RAF, No. 4 Group was disbanded on 24 March 1919.

Reformation in the Second World War 

With the buildup of the RAF prior to the outbreak of the Second World War, No. 4 Group was reformed on 1 April 1937 as part of RAF Bomber Command based at RAF Mildenhall, Suffolk under A/Cdre Arthur Harris (later Air Vice-Marshal "Bomber" Harris). On 29 June 1937 the headquarters were relocated at RAF Linton-on-Ouse, Yorkshire when 4 Group took over a number of stations and squadrons from No. 3 Group RAF. 4 Group was primarily based in Yorkshire for the duration of the war. Its airfields became further concentrated south and east of York when 6 Group was formed (1 March 1943) using airfields north of the city. The flying units of those were these, mainly flying with the Handley Page Heyford biplane bomber:

The group's first operation was on the night of 3 September 1939 when ten Whitley Mk.IIIs of Nos. 51 and 58 Squadrons took off to drop leaflets in the Ruhr and over Hamburg and Bremen.
By this time the group had shrunk to six squadrons and the equipment had been standardised to the Armstrong Whitworth Whitley. RAF Finningley had gone over to No. 5 Group RAF and RAF Leconfield was "Under care and Maintenance" by No. 4 Group.

The first land bombing mission was by 26 out of 30 Whitleys from Nos. 10, 102, 77 and 51 Squadrons detailed to attack the seaplane base at Hornum on 20 March 1940. In April 1940 the group moved its headquarters to Heslington Hall, near York.
In August/September 1940 No. 4 Group took part in eight attacks on Berlin, oil targets and ports. On 1 April 1941 104 Squadron was formed at RAF Driffield as part of No. 4 Group, equipped with the Vickers Wellington and carried out night bombing operations from May 1941 until February 1942.

On 24 July 1941, 4 Group dropped 2,000 lb bombs on the Scharnhorst and Gneisenau and helped to keep these battle-cruisers locked in Brest until 12 February 1942.
By January 1942 the Group had grown considerably and was made out of the following flying units, which were in full conversion from the Whitley to the Vickers Wellington medium and Handley Page Halifax heavy bomber:

On 30/31 May 1942 No. 4 Group played its part in the 1000 bomber raid on Cologne, providing 154 aircraft and the follow-up raid on Essen, providing 142 aircraft.
In early 1943 No. 4 Group made a substantial contribution in the Battle of the Ruhr, which lasted until July. Losses were heavy but the results worthwhile.
By March 1943 the group was made out of these flying units, conversion to the Halifax and Wellington was almost finished (some squadrons having still one or two Whitleys at hand):

In May/June 1944, 4 Group welcomed two French heavy-bomber squadrons - Nos. 346 and 347 Squadrons - to RAF Elvington. On that station a gradual changeover from RAF to French Air Force personnel was effected, so that by September 1944, the station was almost exclusively French and commanded by an officer of the French Air Force.
In July 1944 the group looked like this, having pretty much standardised on the Halifax B.Mk.III:

Prior to the invasion of Normandy in June 1944 intense attacks began on French marshalling yards and gun emplacements on the French coast, troop concentrations and V-weapon sites, reaching a peak in August when 3,629 sorties were flown. In addition No. 4 Group undertook urgent transport work and in little more than one week ferried 432,840 gallons of petrol to the British Second Army during Operation Market Garden.

In 1945, 4 Group attacked targets at Hanover, Magdeburg, Stuttgart, Cologne, Munster and Osnabrück plus the Sterkrade, Wanne-Eickel, Bottrop and many other synthetic-oil centres, bombing by day and night. Its attention later transferred to bombing railway centres in preparation for the crossing of the Rhine.

During the war 61,577 operational sorties were flown, the group trained many Bomber Command crews and helped to create two other bomber groups. On 7 May 1945 No. 4 Group was transferred to Transport Command, and by July 1945 the group consisted of the following flying units:

Commanders
 1 April 1918 Colonel C R Samson
 12 June 1937   Air Commodore Arthur T Harris
 25 May 1938   Air Commodore C H B Blount
 26 June 1939   Air Vice-Marshal Arthur Coningham
 26 July 1941   Air Vice-Marshal C R Carr
 12 February 1945   Air Vice-Marshal John R Whitley
 7 May 1945    Air Vice-Marshal H S P Walmsley
 15 December 1945   Air Vice-Marshal A C Stevens
 2 October 1946    Air Commodore A P Revington

See also
 List of Royal Air Force groups
 List of Royal Air Force aircraft squadrons

References

Citations

Bibliography

 Donnelly, G.L. "Larry", DFM. The Whitley Boys: The Story of No. 4 (Bomber) Group's Operations in the first year of WWII. New Malden, Surrey: Air Research Publications, 1991. .
 Halley, James J. The Squadrons of the Royal Air Force & Commonwealth 1918-1988. Tonbridge, Kent, UK: Air Britain (Historians) Ltd., 1988. .
 Jefford, C.G. RAF Squadrons, a Comprehensive record of the Movement and Equipment of all RAF Squadrons and their Antecedents since 1912. Shrewsbury, Shropshire, UK: Airlife Publishing, 1988 (second edition 2001). .
 Moyes, Philip J.R. Bomber Squadrons of the RAF and their Aircraft. London: Macdonald and Jane's (Publishers) Ltd., 2nd edition 1976. .
 Otter, Patrick. Yorkshire Airfields in the Second World War. Hushion House. 1998. .
 Sturtivant, Ray, ISO and John Hamlin. RAF Flying Training And Support Units since 1912. Tonbridge, Kent, UK: Air-Britain (Historians) Ltd., 2007. .

External links
 RAF History
 No. 4 Group history

004